Johnny Lucas (12 August 1931 – 19 October 1993) was a Luxembourger sprint canoer who competed in the early 1950s. He was born and died in Diekirch. Competing alongside Léon Roth at the 1952 Summer Olympics in Helsinki, he was eliminated in the heats of the K-2 1000 m event.

References
Johnny Lucas' profile at Sports Reference.com

1931 births
1993 deaths
People from Diekirch
Canoeists at the 1952 Summer Olympics
Luxembourgian male canoeists
Olympic canoeists of Luxembourg